The 1538 battle of Kōnodai took place during the Sengoku period of Japanese history, fought by the leader of the Hōjō, Hōjō Ujitsuna, against the combined forces of Satomi Yoshitaka and Ashikaga Yoshiaki (Oyumi). After a long-fought battle between the Hōjō and the allied forces, Ujitsuna emerged as the victor. During the battle Yoshiaki died.

Notes

References
Turnbull, Stephen. The Samurai Sourcebook. London: Cassell & Co., 1998.

1538 in Japan
Konodai (1538)
Conflicts in 1538